Hugo Chakrabongse Levy (born 6 August 1981), known under the mononym Hugo or Thai name Chulachak Chakrabongse is a Thai American actor and singer-songwriter. Based in New York City and signed to Jay-Z's Roc Nation label, his musical style has been dubbed by Roc Nation as "gangsta-rock". He is best known for his bluegrass re-working of Jay-Z's "99 Problems". His debut album, Old Tyme Religion, was released on 10 May 2011. He can trace direct royal heritage back from his maternal great-grandfather, Prince Chakrabongse Bhuvanath, a son of King Rama V of Thailand, and is a second cousin once removed of the King of Thailand, King Vajiralongkorn.

Early life and career
Levy was born in London to M.R. Narisa Chakrabongse, raised in Thailand near the Chao Phraya River, and used to live in the Hell's Kitchen neighborhood of New York City. Now he resides in Bangkok, Thailand. He is the grandson of Prince Chula Chakrabongse, the great-grandson of Chakrabongse Bhuvanath, and the great-great-grandson of King Rama V of Siam. He is of English, Russian, Scottish, Thai and Ukrainian heritage. 

As a teenager, he released four studio albums with the band Siplor, which had several of its records banned on the radio. After moving to London, he became highly influenced by blues musicians such as Howling Wolf, Son House, Robert Johnson and Skip James as well as more modern musicians and bands such as Guns N' Roses, Nirvana, Dr. Dre, Jeff Buckley, MGMT, Tame Impala, Black Rebel Motorcycle Club, Devendra Banhart, The Big Pink and Jack White. He achieved recognition when his song "Disappear" was featured on Beyoncé's album I Am... Sasha Fierce, beginning a series of collaborations that led to a record deal with Jay-Z's Roc Nation label in 2010.

Personal life
Hugo is Muslim; he converted to Islam to marry his longtime girlfriend, Tassanawalai Ongartitthichai, in 2009. The couple have two children.

Band
 Jon Cornell – bass
 Mark Slutsky – drums 
 Chris LoPresto – keyboards 
 Jay Barclay – guitar

Discography

Studio albums
(2011) Old Tyme Religion
 Old Tyme Religion
 99 Problems
 Bread & Butter
 Rock 'n' Roll Delight
 Hopelessly Stoned
 Hurt Makes It Beautiful
 Born
 Mekong River Delta
 Sweetest Cure
 Different Lives
 Just a Shred
 Wake Alone
 Sai Lom (สายลม) (Thailand Edition)

(2014) Deep in the Long Grass
 Twitch and Tug
 I Need the Truth
 Secrets and Lies
 Quiet Fire
 Hailstorms
 Nightshift
 All I Think About
 A Fire Worth Keeping
 The Long Grass
 Down the River
 Feather

(2017) ดำสนิท
 ดำสนิท
 อย่ามาให้เห็น
 ครอบครอง
 อานม้า
 ระวัง
 แค่มีเธอ
 แพ้ให้เป็น
 ยอม
 Love Song No. 9
 บันไดสีแดง

EP
(2020) Lacuna
 Call of the Void
 All That I Know
 The Deals We Make
 Deeper Still
 House of Mercy
 Show Love

Pop culture references 
Hugo's version of "99 Problems," his first single, was featured in the Natalie Portman/Ashton Kutcher romantic comedy No Strings Attached, in the 2011 remake of Fright Night, and in the pilot episode of the NBC thriller series The Blacklist. "Bread and Butter" was featured on the season two television promo for ABC's comedy-drama series Castle. This same song also featured on the seventh season of HBO's hit series, Entourage.

See also
 Roc Nation albums discography

References

1981 births
Living people
Hugo (musician)
Hugo (musician)
Hugo (musician)
Hugo (musician)
Chakrabongse family
British male singer-songwriters
Musicians from London
Roc Nation artists
Thai Muslims
Converts to Islam from Buddhism
Thai television personalities
English-language singers from Thailand
20th-century Thai male actors
Male actors from Bangkok
Thai male film actors
Thai male television actors